Sailing, for the 2013 Pacific Mini Games, took place from Tekaviki Island, in front of the Vakala sailing HQ. The island is located in the northeast from Mata-Utu. Races took place from 3 to 12 September 2013. The Laser and the Hobie 16 classes (individual and team events) were held at these Games.

Results

Medal table

Medal summary

References

2013 Pacific Mini Games
2013 in sailing
2013
Sailing competitions in Wallis and Futuna